Shona McRory Robison (born 26 May 1966) is a Scottish politician serving as the Cabinet Secretary for Social Justice, Housing and Local Government since 2021. A member of the Scottish National Party (SNP), she has been the Member of the Scottish Parliament (MSP) for Dundee City East since 2003 and was an additional member for the North East Scotland region from 1999 to 2003. 

Born in England, Robison studied at the University of Glasgow and Jordanhill College. She was an active member of the SNP's youth wing and worked in Glasgow City Council's Social Work Department, until her election to the Scottish Parliament in 1999.

Robison served as Minister for Public Health and Sport from 2007 to 2011. She then served as Minister for Commonwealth Games and Sport from 2011 to April 2014, when she was promoted to the Scottish Cabinet by Alex Salmond as Cabinet Secretary for Commonwealth Games, Sport, Equalities and Pensioners' Rights by Alex Salmond. When Sturgeon succeeded Salmond as First Minister in November 2014, she appointed Robison the Cabinet Secretary for Health and Sport.

In 2018, she resigned from government during a cabinet reshuffle and returned to the backbenches, where she served on the justice and health committees. In 2021, Robison returned to Sturgeon’s government as the Social Justice Secretary.

Early life 
Shona McRory Robison was born on 26 May 1966 in Redcar, England. Robison attended Alva Academy in Clackmannanshire. She gained a Master of Arts in Social Science at the University of Glasgow in 1989. The following year, she gained a Postgraduate Cert in Community Education at Jordanhill College. 

Robison was an active member of the Scottish National Party's youth wing, where she met the likes of Nicola Sturgeon and Fiona Hyslop. Before being elected to the Scottish Parliament, she worked in Glasgow City Council's Social Work Department.

Member of the Scottish Parliament

Opposition 
Robison contested in the first election to the Scottish Parliament for the Dundee East constituency. Although she was unsuccessful, having came second to Scottish Labour's John McAllion, she was elected as an additional member for the North East Scotland region. In her first term, she was member of the Health and Community Care Committee and was the Deputy Convenor of the Equal Opportunities Committee.

In the 2003 Scottish Parliament election, Robison successfully defeated McAllion by just 100 votes in Dundee East. She served as the Shadow Minister for Health and Social Justice in the SNP's opposition benches. Robison was a member of the Health Committee.

Junior Minister 

After the SNP's victory in the 2007 election, Robison was appointed as the Minister for Public Health. In 2009, she added Sport onto her portfolio. In the 2011 election, Robison was re-elected into the newly drawn, Dundee City East constituency. She was appointed Minister for Commonwealth Games and Sport.

In the run up to the Scottish independence referendum in 2014, Robison wrote to the University of Dundee to complain that a Dundee professor had chaired an event for the Better Together campaign. Robison insisted that Christopher Whatley's involvement in the Five Million Questions project about the implications of the referendum meant he should have taken a neutral stance on the constitutional issue. However, Scottish Conservative leader Ruth Davidson said: “I'm not sure this kind of bullying and intimidation is the best advert for the SNP's vision of a future separate Scotland. In fact, it is chilling."

In April 2014, Alex Salmond promoted her to the full Cabinet position of Cabinet Secretary for Commonwealth Games, Sport, Equalities and Pensioners' Rights.

Health Secretary 
On 21 November 2014, Robison was appointed by Sturgeon as Cabinet Secretary for Health, Wellbeing and Sport, in Sturgeon's first government. Following the 2016 election, she was reappointed into Sturgeon's cabinet as Cabinet Secretary for Health and Sport.

In January 2018, during an appearance at Holyrood's Health and Sport Committee, she was warned by Labour MSP Neil Findlay of a "drugs disaster". In 2018, Scotland went on to record the highest number of drug deaths per head in the European Union, at a rate nearly three times higher than the UK average.

On 26 June 2018, she announced her intention to resign from Cabinet. Shortly after a cabinet reshuffle was made by Sturgeon. BBC political correspondent Glenn Campbell wrote after the reshuffle: "The most widely anticipated departure was that of health secretary, Shona Robison. She's been under considerable pressure over NHS performance. She stood down on the day the Scottish government confirmed its worst cancer waiting times for six years."

Backbencher 
Following her resignation from government, Robison returned to the backbenches. She served on the Parliament's Justice Committee and Social Security Committee. Amid the outbreak of the Coronavirus pandemic, she served as a member of the COVID-19 Committee.

In February 2021, Audit Scotland published a report that concluded the Scottish Government had not prepared adequately for a pandemic. The watchdog also noted that recommendations from pandemic planning exercises during Robison's time as Health Secretary had not been fully implemented. One particular failure it highlighted was that not enough had been done to ensure Scottish hospitals and care homes had enough personal protective equipment (PPE). Overall, it concluded that ministers "could have been better prepared to respond to the Covid-19 pandemic". Nicola Sturgeon said there were "lots of lessons to learn".

Return to Government 
On 20 May 2021, Sturgeon announced her third government, with Robison returning as Cabinet Secretary for Social Justice, Housing and Local Government.

Personal life
She was married to Stewart Hosie, who is the Westminster MP for Dundee East and was previously the SNP's Depute Leader. They have one daughter. It was announced on 15 May 2016 that the couple separated. This was followed by reports that Hosie had had an affair with Westminster-based freelance journalist Serena Cowdy.

Footnotes

References

External links
personal website
 
profile on Scottish Government website
profile on SNP website
Dundee SNP website
They Work For You
BBC Democracy Live
Public Whip Voting Record

|-

|-

|-

|-

|-

1966 births
Living people
Members of the Scottish Parliament for Dundee constituencies
People from Redcar
Scottish National Party MSPs
Members of the Scottish Parliament 1999–2003
Members of the Scottish Parliament 2003–2007
Members of the Scottish Parliament 2007–2011
Members of the Scottish Parliament 2011–2016
Members of the Scottish Parliament 2016–2021
Members of the Scottish Parliament 2021–2026
Members of the Scottish Cabinet
Health ministers of Scotland
Sports ministers
Women members of the Scottish Government
20th-century Scottish women politicians
Alumni of the University of Glasgow
Anglo-Scots